Nikolaos Anastasopoulos (born 5 August 1979) is a Greek former professional footballer who played as a goalkeeper.

Early life 
Nikolaos was born in the city of Thessaloniki in the Greek region of Macedonia.

Career 
He began his career in Naoussa F.C. In the summer 1999, he signed for PAOK F.C. After one and half year, Anastasopoulos was uncapped and left from the club in January 2001, due to financial problems. He joined at Xanthi F.C. and played there for 5,5 years. Then, hemoved to Larnaca, Cyprus and played for AEK Larnaca and only played there for the year and then moved back to Greece to play for Tripoli bases club Asteras Tripoli and was settled there for 4 years and then decided to move on to Corfu on the island of Kerkyra to play for Kerkyra and played there for two years and then he moved once again, this time to Veria to play for Veria and played there for a year and then in 2014 he decided to return to where it all began at Skoda Xanthi and played their for one year and in the summer of 2015, he was released from the club.

References

1979 births
Living people
Greek footballers
Greece under-21 international footballers
Greek expatriate footballers
AEK Larnaca FC players
Xanthi F.C. players
Asteras Tripolis F.C. players
A.O. Kerkyra players
Veria F.C. players
PAOK FC players
Naoussa F.C. players
Super League Greece players
Cypriot First Division players
Expatriate footballers in Cyprus
Association football goalkeepers
Footballers from Thessaloniki
Greek expatriate sportspeople in Cyprus